

Events
January 1 – "At length the fleeting Year is o'er", a setting by William Boyce of an ode by William Whitehead, receives its first public performance, at St James's Palace in London, England.
January 2 – The funeral of Sigismund von Schrattenbach, Archbishop of Salzburg, is the occasion for the first performance of Michael Haydn's Missa pro defunctis Archespiscopo.
March 13 – Florian Leopold Gassmann replaces Georg Reutter II as Hofkapellmeister to the court of Emperor Joseph II in Vienna.
June 5 – Carl Ditters von Dittersdorf is ennobled by Empress Maria Theresa.
date unknown
Carl Stamitz is resident composer at Versailles.
Dr Charles Burney visits Johann Baptist Wanhal in Vienna.
Ignaz Pleyel becomes a pupil of Joseph Haydn.
 Opéra flamand is established in Brussels.

Classical music
Johann Christian Bach – Symphonie Concertante in G C32
Luigi Boccherini 
6 String Quintets, G.277-282 (Op.13)
6 String Trios, G.95-100 (Op.14)
6 String Quartets G. 177-182 (Op. 15)
6 Cello Sonatas
Christian Cannabich – Symphony No. 50 in D minor
Giovanni Battista Cirri – 8 Duets for 2 Cellos, Op. 8
Maria Rosa Coccia – 6 Harpsichord Sonatas, Op.1
Giovanni Battista Costanzi – Cello Concerto in D major (originally attributed to J. Haydn as Hob.VIIb:4)
Johann Christian Fischer – Oboe Concerto No.1 in C major
Florian Leopold Gassmann 
La Betulia Liberata (oratorio)
6 Quintets, Op. 2
 François Joseph Gossec – Symphony 'de Chasse', RH 41
Joseph Haydn
Baryton Trio No. 76 in C major, Hob.XI:76
Flötenuhr in C major, Hob.XIX:10
Flötenuhr in C major, Hob.XIX:16
Mass in G major, Hob.XXII:6
Symphony 44 "Trauer"
Symphony 45 "Farewell"
Symphony 46
Symphony 47 "Palindrome"
String Quartets, Op. 20
 Guillaume Lasceux – Magnificat in F major
 Gabriele Leone –  6 Duos pour deux violons qui peuvent se jouer sur la mandoline et sur le pardessus (6 Duets for two violins that can be played on the mandolin and on the descant viol)
 Andrea Luchesi – 6 Sonatas for harpsichord and violin Op. 1
Wolfgang Amadeus Mozart 
Grabmusik, K.42/35a
Church Sonata in E-flat major, K.67/41h
Kyrie in G major, K.89/73k
20 Minuets, K.103/61d
Symphony No.15 in G major, K.124
Litaniae de venerabili altaris sacramento, K.125
Regina coeli in B-flat major, K.127
Symphonies 16-21, K. 128-130, 132-134
Divertimenti K. 136–138 "Salzburg Symphonies"
Wie unglücklich bin ich nit, K.147/125g
String Quartet No.2 in D major, K.155/134a
String Quartet No.4 in C major, K.157
6 Minuets, K.164/130a
Die Mailänder Quartette K. Anh 210–213
James Nares – 6 Fugues with Introductory Voluntary's for the Organ or Harpsichord
Giovanni Paisiello – Requiem for Gennara di Borbone
Stephen Paxton – 6 Solos for the cello, Op. 1
Franz Xaver RIchter – 6 String Quartets, Op. 5
Giovanni Battista Sammartini – Symphony in A major, J-C 60
Carl Stamitz – 6 Symphonies, Op. 9

Opera
Pasquale Anfossi –Alessandro nelle Indie
Johann Christian Bach 
Endimione
Temistocle
 Domenico Cimarosa – Le stravaganze del conte
Wolfgang Amadeus Mozart
Il sogno di Scipione
Lucio Silla
 Giovanni Paisiello 
 La Semiramide in villa, R.1.31
 La Dardané, R.1.33
 Gli amanti comici, R.1.34
 Tommaso Traetta – Antigona

Popular music
Rev. William Leeves & Lady Anne Barnard – "Auld Robin Gray"

Methods and theory writings 

 Michel Corrette – Nouvelle méthode pour apprendre à jouer la Mandoline
 Louis-Joseph Francoeur – Diapason général de tous les instrumens à vent
 Raparlier – Principes de musique
 Johann Karl Gustav Wernich – Versuch einer richtigen Lehrart die Harfe zu spielen

Births
January 4 – Anton Friedrich Justus Thibaut, musician (died 1840)
February 26 – Kaspar Fürstenau, flautist (died 1819)
March 17 – Stephen Jenks, musician (died 1856)
March 30 – Johann Wilhelm Wilms, composer (died 1847)
April 1 – Ignaz Franz von Mosel, composer and conductor (died 1844)
April 25 – Louis Deland, actor, singer and dancer (died 1823)
May 1 – Jacques-Michel Hurel de Lamare, cellist (died 1823)
May 2 – Friedrich von Hardenberg, librettist and poet (died 1801)
June 10 – Greta Naterberg, folk singer (d. 1818)
June 12 – Franz Cramer, violinist (died 1848)
July 15 – Lucile Grétry, French composer (died 1790)
August 26 – Maria Frances Parke, composer (died 1822)
September 3 – Nicola Tacchinardi, cellist and operatic tenor (died 1859)
September 27 – Antonio Casimir Cartellieri, Polish-Austrian composer (died 1807)
October 4 – Francois-Louis Perne, composer (died 1832)
November 10– Johann Nepomuk Kaňka, composer (died 1865)
November 18 – Prince of Prussia Louis Ferdinand, composer and prince (died 1806)
December 8 – Prince Joseph Franz Maximilian Lobkowitz, patron of Beethoven (died 1816)
unknown date – Cyrill Demian, piano and organ maker (died 1847)

Deaths
February 13 – Pierre-Claude Foucquet, organist and harpsichordist (born 1694)
March – Francesco Carattoli, operatic bass (born )
March 11 – Georg Reutter II, composer (born 1708)
April 19 – Johann Peter Kellner, organist and composer (born 1705)
April 22 – Marie Favart, opera singer, actress and dancer (born 1727)
May 6 – Edmund Pascha, organist and composer (born 1714)
June 15 – Claude Daquin, composer and organist (born 1694)
August 21 – Alessandro Felici, Italian composer (born 1742)
October 8 – Jean-Joseph de Mondonville, violinist and composer (born 1711) 
Panna Cinka, violinist (born 1711)

References

 
18th century in music
Music by year